Golo-Djigbé is a town and arrondissement in the Atlantique Department of southern Benin. It is an administrative division under the jurisdiction of the commune of Abomey-Calavi. The population is 28,103 in 2013.

Transports 
The district will be connected by air transport with the Golo-Djigbé International Airport scheduled for delivery in December 2020.

References 

Populated places in the Atlantique Department
Arrondissements of Benin